Matt Thorne, also known as Matt Thorr, is a bassist who has played in the glam metal band Ratt, Rough Cutt, and Jailhouse. He co-wrote the song "Back For More" with Stephen Pearcy on Ratt's album Out of the Cellar. He currently owns MT Studios for BlueThumbProductions in Burbank, California where he has produced, engineered and mixed albums for artists such as The Eels, Trapt, and 8th Day.

Discography

With Ratt
 Metal Massacre Vol. 1 (Ratt "Tell the World") Not included on CD re-issue (1982)
 The Garage Tape Dayz 78-81 (2000)
 Rattus Erectus 1976-1982 (2004)
 In Your Direction (2004)

With Rough Cutt
 Rough Cutt÷ (1985)
 Wants You! (1986)
 Rough Cutt Live (1996)
 Anthology (2008)

With Jailhouse
 Alive in a Mad World (1989)
 Jailhouse (1998)

With Tuff
 History of Tuff (2001) *Producer

With Platinum Overdose
 Murder In High Heels (2019)
 Back For The Thrill. (2020)

References

External links
Blue Thumb Productions website

American bass guitarists
Rough Cutt members
Ratt members
Year of birth missing (living people)
Living people